This is a list of museums and galleries in Mexico.

Museums and galleries

Aguascalientes
 Aguascalientes Museum
 Guadalupe Posada Museum
 Museo Descubre (IMAX screen)
 Museum of Contemporary Art
 Museo Espacio - MECA
 National Museum of Death
 State History Museum
 Museo Ferrocarrilero de Aguascalientes
 Museum of Traditional Mexican Toys
 Centro Cultural Los Arquitos
 Insurgency Museum
 Museo Comunitario Tepetzalán

Baja California
 Tijuana Cultural Center
 Tijuana Wax Museum
 Tijuana Trompo Museum
 Museo Sol del Niño (IMAX screen)
 Museo Universitario Mexicali  (has photos, fossils, etc. of Baja California Norte)
 History of the City of Ensenada
 El Museo de la Vid y el Vino

Baja California Sur
 Museum of Jesuit Missions
 Regional Museum of Anthropology and History
 Museum of Saint Ignacio paintings
 Museum of Telecommunications Tomás Guzmán Cantú
 Museum of Natural History

Campeche
 Museum of the City of Campeche
 Museum of San Miguel Fort
 Archaeology Museum
 Weapons and Navy Museum

Chiapas
 Regional Museum of Anthropology and History of Chiapas
 Museum of Santo Domingo Ex Convent
 Museum of Tapachula
 Museum of Mayan Medicine
 Museum of the city of Tuxtla Gutierrez
 Archaeological Museum of Comitán
 Archaeological Museum of Palenque
 Museo del Ámbar de Chiapas (Amber Museum)

Chihuahua

 Francisco Villa Museum
 Historical Museum of the Mexican Revolution
 Museo de las Culturas del Norte
 Quinta Gameros

Coahuila
 Museo del Desierto
 Museo de las Aves de México
 Museo Arocena

Colima
 Regional Museum of the History of Colima

Durango 

 Ganot-Peschard Museum of Archeology
 Museo de la Ferrería
 Regional Museum of Durango

Guanajuato 
 Museo Casa Estudio Diego Rivera y Frida Kahlo
 Mummy Catacombs
 Explora Science Center (IMAX screen)
Iconographic Museum of Quixote
 San Miguel de Allende Museum
 Saint Paul Convent Museum
 Museo de la Ciudad, León
 Museo Regional de Guanajuato Alhóndiga de Granaditas

Guerrero
 Regional Museum of Guerrero
 Historic Museum of Acapulco
 William Spratling Museum

Hidalgo
 Historical Archive and Museum of Mining, Pachuca
 National Photography Museum
 Mining Museum
 Tula Archeological Museum

Jalisco
 Tequila and Mariachi Museum
 Paleontology Museum of Guadalajara
 Medicine History Museum
 Huichol Art Museum
 Newspaper and Graphic Arts Museum
 Army and Air Force Museum
 Science and Technology Museum
 Ceramics Museum
 Wax Museum
 Museum of Guadalajara Art
 Museum of Zapopan Art
 Museum of the City of Guadalajara
 Museo "Casa Agustín Rivera".
 Museo del Cuale.
 Museo Arqueológico de Ciudad Guzmán.
 Museo Raúl Anguiano

Mexico City 
The Mexican government published a guide to Mexico City museums in 2016.

Alameda Art Laboratory
Altepepialcalli Regional Museum – Milpa Alta
Alvar and Carmen T. de Carrillo Gil Museum of Art
Anahuacalli Museum
Blaisten Collection Museum
UAEM Casa de Cultura Tlalpan
Archeological Museum of Azcapotzalco Príncipe Tlaltecatzin - Azcapotzalco
Archeological Museum of Cuicuilco
Archeological Museum of Xochimilco
Archeological Park of Luis G. Urbina
Archeological Zone of the Templo Mayor
Army and Air Force Museum of Mexico 
Automobile Museum of Mexico
Calmecac Cultural Center – Barrio Santa Martha
Cárcamo de Dolores, Bosque de Chapultepec.
Caricature Museum of Mexico 99 Donceles, Centro
Casa del Lago
Casa Lamm Cultural Center
Casa Luis Barragán House of architect Luis Barragán
Casasola Photography Bazaar 26 Madero
Centro de la Imagen (art)
Chapel of San Antonio Panzacola – Barrio Santa Catarina
The Chapultepec Castle National Museum of History
Charrería Museum
Chopo University Museum
Cloister of Sor Juana Ines de la Cruz – Plaza de San Jeronimo 47 Centro
Convent El Carmen Museum
Cuauhnahuac Regional Museum
Culhuacan Community Center
Cuitlahuac Museum
Diego Rivera Mural Museum
Dr. Samuel Fastlicht Museum – UNAM
Dolores Olmedo Patiño Museum
El Carmen Museum (art)
Estanquillo Museum
Ex Hacienda El Molino Cultural Center
Ex Hacienda San Gabriel de Barrera
Ex Templo de Santa Teresa La Antigua
Ex Templo San Agustin – (anthropology)
Ex Teresa Convent Modern Art Museum – Centro
Felix de Jesus Museum – Escandon
Franz Mayer Museum
Frida Kahlo Museum (Casa Azul)
Frissac House – Tlalpan borough
Fuego Nuevo Museum
Geles Cabrera Museum of Sculpture – Coyoacan
General Archive of the Nation of Mexico (history)
Geological Museum of UNAM – Jaime Torres Bodet 176 Santa Maria la Ribera Cuauhtemoc
Geology and Sciences of the Herat Museum - National Polytechnic Institute Bldg 9
Gonzalo Lopez Cid Auditorium - Citlalmina
Guadalupe Basílica Museum
Hacienda de San Cristóbal Polaxtla Museum
Hacienda de Santa Mónica Museum
 Hellenic Cultural Institute of Mexico (Instituto Cultural Helénico)
Hidalgo Social and Cultural Center – Tlapan
House and Museum of Alfonso Reyes
House Studio of Diego Rivera and Frida Kahlo
House of the First Print Shop in the Americas
Interactive Museum of Economics – Tacuba Street
Jaime Torres Bodet Cultural Center
Jesús Reyes Heroles Casa de Cultura – Coyoacan
José Luis Cuevas Museum
Jose Maria Velasco Gallery
Lebanese Center of Mexico
The Leon Trotsky Museum
Luis Enrique Erro Planetarium
Memory and Tolerance Museum
Mexico City Museum
Mexico City’s Wax Museum
Miguel Hidalgo People’s Social Center– San Juan de Aragon 2nd section
Mixquic Archeological Museum – Tlahuac borough
Museo de Arte Moderno
Museum of Light (Museo de la Luz)
Museo Archivo de la Fotografía
Museum of Mexican Constitutions
Museum of Mexican Medicine – Brasil 33 Centro
Museum of Natural History (Mexico City)
Museum of the Palace of Fine Arts
Museum of Parliament Precinct
Museo de Arte Moderno
Museum of Popular Art
Museo de la Bola Museum
Museum of SHCP
 Museo del Estanquillo
 National Photography Museum
Museum in Honor of Benito Juarez - National Palace
National Anthropological Museum.
National Center of the Arts of Mexico
National Museum of Art
National Museum of Cultures- Moneda 13 Centro
Museo Nacional de las Culturas Populares
Museo Nacional de Historia. Castillo de Chapultepec.
National Museum of Graphic Arts – Mar Arafura 8 Popotla Miguel Hidalgo
Nacional Museum of Engraving (Museo de la Estampa) - Plaza de Santa Vera Cruz
Museo Nacional de las Intervenciones
Museum of Women
National Museum of Popular Cultures Coyacan
National Museum of Popular Arts and Industries – Ave Juarez 44 Centro Cuauhtemoc
National Museum of Popular Culture
National Museum of the Revolution
Naval History Museum of Mexico – Coyacan
Necroteca Museum – UNAM
Ollin Yoliztli Cultural Center
Palace of Autonomy Museum
Palace of Iturbide (art)
Palace of Mining
Paleontology Museum – UNAM
Papalote Children’s Museum (IMAX screen)
The Postal Museum
 Papalote museo del niño (IMAX Screen)
Pinacoteca de la Profesa
R. Flores Magon Casa de la Cultura – Ex Ejido San Pablo Tepetlapa
Rafael Solana Cultural Center
Ripley’s Believe it or not Museum, Londres St Juarez
Risco House Museum
The Rufino Tamayo Museum
San Angel Cultural Center– San Angel
The San Carlos Museum Puente de Alvarado 50 Revolucion Cuauhtemoc
San Ildefonso Museum (Art)
Siqueiros Cultural Polyforum
Siquieros Hall of Public Art
The Snail Museum Gallery of Natural History
Soumaya Museum
Spanish Cultural Center – Centro
Technological Museum of the Federal Commission of Electricity
Tlahuac Regional Museum – Tlahuac borough
Tlalpan History Museum – Tlapan
UNAM Sculpture Space (Espacio Escultorico UNAM) Ciudad Universitaria
University Museum of Sciences and Arts
Venustiano Carranza Museum (history)
Victoria Museum of Telephony – Centro
Watercolor Museum (Museo de la Acuarela), Villa Coyoacan
 Universum (UNAM)  (science)

Michoacán
 Museum of Popular Arts and Industries
 Museo Casa de Morelos.
 Museo Regional Michoacano "Dr. Nicolás León Calderón".
 Museo de Sitio de Tzintzuntzan.
 Museo de la Estampa Ex Convento de Santa María Magdalena.

Morelos

 Museum of the City of Cuernavaca
 El Castillo (Photograph Museum of the City)
 Juarez Museum devoted to President Benito Juarez
 Museo Regional Cuauhnáhuac (Palace of Cortes)
 Museum of Herbal Medicine
 David Alfaro Siqueiros Home and Workshop
 Brady Museum (private art collection)
 Museo y Centro de Documentación Histórica Ex Convento de Tepoztlán.
 Museo Histórico del Oriente de Morelos "Casa de Morelos". Museo Local.
 Museo de Sitio de Xochicalco. Sitio arqueológico.
 Jardín Etnobotánico y Museo de Medicina Tradicional y Herbolaria. Museo Local.
 Museo de Sitio de Coatetelco. Sitio arqueológico.

Nayarit
 Cuatro Pueblos Museum (museum of four cultures: huicholes, coras, tepehuanos and mexicaneros)
 Amado Nervo Museum
 Regional Museum of Anthropology

Nuevo León
 Museo de Arte Contemporáneo (MARCO) (Contemporany Museum of Art), Monterrey
 Museo de Historia Mexicana, Monterrey
 {Museo Metropolitano de Monterrey, Monterrey
 Museo del Palacio de Gobierno, Monterrey
 Museo Palacio del Obispado (Bishopric's Palace Museum), Monterrey
 Museo Arquidiocesano de Arte Sacro, Monterrey
 Museo del Acero Horno 3 (Horno 3 Museum of Steel), Fundidora Park, Monterrey
 Museo del Vidrio, Monterrey
 Museo de Historia del Noreste, Monterrey
 Colegio Civil, Monterrey
 Planetario Alfa (Alfa Planetarium Science Museum), San Pedro Garza García
 Museo del Valle del Pilón, Montemorelos
 Museo Bernabé de las Casas, Mina
 Hacienda San Pedro (Hacienda of San Pedro), General Zuazua
 Papalote museo del niño, Monterrey

Oaxaca
 Cultural Centre of Oaxaca in the Church of Santo Domingo de Guzmán
 Museo de las Culturas de Oaxaca
 Rufino Tamayo Museum (Museum of Prehispanic Art)
 Museo de Arte Contemporáneo de Oaxaca (Museum of Contemporary Art)
 Museo de los Pintores Oaxaqueños (Museum of Oaxacan Painters)
 Casa de Juárez (Museum of Mexican President Benito Juárez)
 Museo Philatélica de Oaxaca (Stamp Museum)
 Railway Museum of Southern Mexico
 Instituto de Artes Gráficas de Oaxaca
 Museo Estatal de Arte Popular de Oaxaca

Puebla

 Automobile Museum
 National Museum of Mexican Railroads
 Amparo Museum (Prehispanic, Colonial, Modern and Contemporary Mexican Art)
 Museo Poblano de Arte Virreinal

Querétaro
 Regional Museum of Querétaro

Quintana Roo
 Cancún Archaeological Museum
 Museum of Maya Culture
 Museo de la Isla de Cozumel (Cozumel Island Museum)

San Luis Potosí
 Regional Museum of San Luis

Sinaloa 
 Mazatlán Archaeological Museum

Sonora 
 Museo Regional de Sonora

State of Mexico
 Museo de Virreinato
 Museum of Fine Arts
 Museum of Modern Art
 Museum of Popular Cultures
 Museum of Natural Sciences
 Museum of Anthropology and History
 Print Museum
 Watercolor Museum
 House of Handcrafts
 Numismatics Museum (the only one in Latin America)
 José Vasconcelos Museum
 Museo Felipe Santiago Gutiérrez
 Luis Nishizawa Workshop Museum
 Teotihuacan Museum
 Manuel Gamio Museum

Tabasco

 Planetarium Tabasco (IMAX screen)
 Tabasco Institute of Culture
 Natural History Museum
 Museo de Sitio de Pomoná.
 Museo de Sitio La Venta.
 Museo de Sitio de Comalcalco.
 Museo de Oxolotán.

Tamaulipas
 Museo del Agrarismo. Matamoros

Tlaxcala 
 Regional Museum of Tlaxcala
 Museo de Sitio de Xochitécatl.
 Museo de Sitio de Cacaxtla.
 Museo de Sitio de Ocotelulco.
 Museo de Sitio de Tizatlán.

Veracruz
 Museo de Antropología de Xalapa
 Museo Interactivo de Xalapa (IMAX screen)
 Hacienda del Lencero
 Pinacoteca Diego Rivera
 Jardín de Esculturas
 Museo Casa Xalapa (Museum of the city of Xalapa)
 Museo del Fuerte De San Juan de Ulua
 Veracruz Wax Museum
 Veracruz Institute of Culture
 The Museum of the City of Veracruz
 Museo del Recinto de la Reforma.
 Museo Histórico Naval (Naval History Museum).
 Casa Principal.
 Museo Baluarte de Santiago.
 Casa Museo Salvador Díaz Mirón.
 Archivo y Galería del Arte.
 Museum of the Mexican Revolution.
 Oil Museum
 Archaeological Museum of Córdoba
 Museum of the City of Córdoba
 National Museum of Fantastic Art
 Museum of Veracruz Fauna
 Museum of Orizaba Art
 Marine Museum of Tecolutla
 Museum of the State of Veracruz Art Felipe Neri
 Yanga Museum; dedicated to Gaspar Yanga who has the first successful slave revolt in the Americas
 Museum of the Old Train Station
 Museo Fotográfico de Nanchital (Photography Museum of Nanchital)
 Agustín Lara Museum
 Tuxteco Museum
 Jarocho Museum
 Museum of Tajín (UNESCO World Heritage Site)
 Museo Baluarte de Santiago
 Museo el Zapotal
 Museo de Cempoala
 Museo de Sitio San Lorenzo
 Museo de Sitio Tres Zapotes
 Museo de Sitio de Higueras
 Museo de Sitio de la Matamba
 Community Museum of Atoyac
 Community Museum of Coscomatepec
 Community Museum of Emiliano Zapata
 Community Museum of Jalcomulco
 Community Museum of Jamapa
 Community Museum David Ramírez Lavoignet
 Community Museum of Acamalín
 Community Museum Paseo del Correo
 Community Museum Serafín Olarte
 Community Museum el Jonotal
 Community Museum of Tenochtitlán

Yucatán
 Museo de Historia Natural
 Museo de Arte Contemporáneo Ateneo de Yucatán (MACAY)
 Museo de la Canción Yucateca Asociación Civil
 Museo de Arte Popular
 Museo de la Ciudad de Mérida
 Museo de Antropología e Historia "Palacio Cantón"(Anthropology and History Museum)

Zacatecas
 Museo Manuel Felguérez
 Museo de Sitio de la zona arqueológica Alta Vista – Chalchihuites
 Museo de La Quemada
 Museo de Guadalupe
 Museo Rafael Coronel
 Museo Pedro Coronel
 Museo Zacatecano

See also 
 List of archives in Mexico

References 

Mexico
 
Mexico education-related lists
Lists of buildings and structures in Mexico
Museums
Mexico